Vining is the name of several places in the United States. It may refer to:

Vining, Iowa
Vining, Kansas
Vining, Minnesota

See also 
 Vining (surname)
 Vinings (disambiguation)